Glen Brand (3 November 1923 – 15 November 2008) was an American wrestler and Olympic champion in Freestyle wrestling. Brand competed in freestyle wrestling at the 1948 Summer Olympics in London, where he received a gold medal in the middleweight class.

He was a raised in Clarion, Iowa and a graduate of Iowa State University. He was a three-time All-American for the Cyclones with an overall record of 54-3, earning a reputation as a fierce competitor and pinner. He was the first ISU athlete named to The Des Moines Register Sports Hall of Fame. In 1978, Brand was inducted into the National Wrestling Hall of Fame as a Distinguished Member.

A high school wrestling tournament is held each year in his hometown of Clarion, Iowa. He died in Omaha, Nebraska in 2008, at the age of 85.

Glen Brand Wrestling Hall of Fame of Iowa
The "Glen Brand Wrestling Hall of Fame of Iowa" began in 2002 and honors people connected to wrestling and Iowa. It is part of the National Wrestling Hall of Fame Dan Gable Museum in Waterloo, Iowa, which is operated by the Dan Gable International Wrestling Institute and Museum. The National Wrestling Hall of Fame Dan Gable Museum, should not be confused with the National Wrestling Hall of Fame and Museum in Stillwater, Oklahoma.

References

External links
 

Wrestlers at the 1948 Summer Olympics
American male sport wrestlers
Olympic gold medalists for the United States in wrestling
1923 births
2008 deaths
People from Clarion, Iowa
Medalists at the 1948 Summer Olympics
Iowa State University alumni
20th-century American people